Football Club Tartu Santos is an Estonian football club based in Tartu. Their home ground is Tartu Annelinna kunstmurustaadion.

History
In 2014 Santos, while competing in the third tier of Estonian football, reached the 2013–14 Estonian Cup final. Their opponent in the final was the reigning Estonian champion FC Levadia, already qualified for the Champions League, therefore Santos qualified for the 2014–15 UEFA Europa League as cup runner-up. Santos went out on aggregate 1–13 to Tromsø of Norway but scored their first ever goal in a European competition.

Because of their appearance in the 2013–14 Estonian Cup final, Santos also qualified for the Estonian Supercup at the start of the 2015 season. They faced 2014 Meistriliiga champions FC Levadia Tallinn. The match took place on 3 March 2015 and finished in a 5–0 defeat for Santos.

After the 2018 Esiliiga season, the club decided to continue as a full-amateur team and drop 2 leagues lower to II liiga.

Players

Current squad

 ''As of 11 April 2017.

Honours

Domestic
 Esiliiga B
 Runners-up (1): 2014
 II Liiga
 Winner (3): 2006, 2008, 2013
 III Liiga
 Winner (1): 2005
 IV Liiga
 Winner (1): 2004
 V Liiga
 Winner (1): 2003
 Estonian Cup
 Runners-up (1): 2014

UEFA club competition results
European record

Matches

Notes
 1Q: First qualifying round

Statistics

League and Cup

Coaches

References

External links
 Official Website

Football clubs in Estonia
Association football clubs established in 2006
Association football clubs disestablished in 2019
Sport in Tartu
2006 establishments in Estonia
2019 disestablishments in Estonia